The Cape of Good Hope is a rocky headland on the Atlantic coast of South Africa.

Cape of Good Hope may also refer to:

 Dutch Cape Colony, a colony of the Dutch East India Company in present-day South Africa
 Colony of the Cape of Good Hope, more commonly called the Cape Colony, a former British colony in present-day South Africa and Namibia, that succeeded the Dutch Cape Colony
 Province of the Cape of Good Hope, more commonly the Cape Province''', a province in the Union of South Africa and subsequently the Republic of South Africa that replaced the Cape Colony
 University of the Cape of Good Hope, now the University of South Africa (Unisa)
 Cape of Good Hope (film), a 2004 South African comedy drama film
 Cape of Good Hope (horse), a British Thoroughbred racehorse

See also
 Good Hope (disambiguation)
 Cape of Good Hope race, a proposed human racial division composed of the Southern African bushmen
 Cape of Good Hope Station, a former British Royal Navy Station Order of Good Hope, officially Order of the Cape of Good Hope'', a knighthood order
 Cape (disambiguation)